In the Dungeons & Dragons fantasy role-playing game, psionics are a form of supernatural power similar to, but distinct from, arcane and divine magic.

Overview
Psionics are manifested purely by mental discipline. Psionics were originally introduced in the original Dungeons & Dragons Supplement III – Eldritch Wizardry. Psionics have appeared in all editions; however, they are only part of the core rules in Advanced Dungeons & Dragons 1st edition. In 2nd, 3rd and 3.5 editions, psionics are divided into five or six disciplines, or groupings of powers. In 2nd edition, Psionicists gradually gain access to additional disciplines as they advance in level. In 3.5 edition, several psionic character classes are forced to choose one of them, thereby losing access to the most potent powers of the others. In 2nd edition, each power is tied to an ability score (generally Constitution, Intelligence or Wisdom); in 3rd edition, each discipline is tied to an ability score; and in 3.5 edition, all powers use the same ability score: either Intelligence, Wisdom, or Charisma depending on the manifester's class.

Earlier editions also included psionic combat; however, it was eliminated in 3.5 edition, with the attack and defense modes converted into standard psionic powers.

Clairsentience Clairsentience powers enable a character to learn secrets long forgotten, to glimpse the immediate future and predict the far future, to find hidden objects, and to know what is normally unknowable. They include precognition and remote viewing. A psion who specializes in clairsentience is known as a seer, and is most akin to an arcane diviner. In 3rd edition, Clairsentience is linked to Wisdom.

Metacreativity Metacreativity powers create objects, creatures, or some form of matter. Creatures a character creates usually, but not always, obey their creator's commands. Powers of the metacreativity discipline include astral construct and greater psionic fabricate. A psion who specializes in metacreativity is known as a shaper, and is most akin to an arcane conjurer. Metacreativity was not introduced until 3rd edition. In 3rd edition, Metacreativity is linked to Intelligence.

Metapsionics Metapsionic powers generally augment other psionic powers, although the discipline also contains some utility powers. The Metapsionics discipline was introduced in 2nd edition, and was not carried over into 3rd edition. In the 3rd and 3.5 editions, abilities which were part of the Metapsionics discipline in 2nd edition are often handled through metapsionic feats and item creation feats, although some metapsionic powers were converted into Clairsentience or Telepathy powers.

Psychokinesis Psychokinesis powers manipulate energy or tap the power of the mind to produce a desired end. Many of these powers produce spectacular effects such as moving, melting, transforming, or blasting a target. Psychokinesis powers can deal large amounts of damage. They include energy missile and tornado blast. A psion who specializes in psychokinesis is known as a kineticist, and is most akin to an arcane evoker. In 3rd edition, Psychokinesis is linked to Constitution.

Psychometabolism Psychometabolism powers change the physical properties of some creature, thing, or condition. They include animal affinity and psionic revivify. A psion who specializes in psychometabolism is known as an egoist, and is most akin to an arcane transmuter. In 3rd edition, Psychometabolism is linked to Strength.

Psychoportation Psychoportation powers move the manifester, an object, or another creature through space and time. They include astral caravan and psionic teleport. A psion who specializes in psychoportation is known as a nomad, and has no arcane counterpart. In 3rd edition, Psychoportation is linked to Dexterity.

Telepathy Telepathy powers can spy on and affect the minds of others, influencing or controlling their behavior. They include psionic suggestion and mind switch. A psion who specializes in telepathy is known as a telepath, and is most akin to an arcane enchanter. In 3rd edition, Telepathy is linked to Charisma.

Prior to 3rd edition, magic and psionics are treated as distinct from each other. For example, the Detect Invisibility spell will penetrate both magical and psionic invisibility, as it detects invisibility in general, while the Detect Magic spell will not detect psionic effects, as it is restricted to magical effects and psionic effects are non-magical.

In 3rd and 3.5 editions, the standard psionics system incorporates psionics–magic transparency, which treats psionic energy and magic as mutually and equally vulnerable to a dispel magic spell or a dispel psionics power; spell resistance protects against powers just as it protects against spells, while power resistance protects against spells as it does against powers. This is primarily done for game balance, as if psionics were not resistible or able to be dispelled in such a fashion psionic characters would be inordinately powerful in a world designed mostly to handle traditional magic (although they in turn would also be especially susceptible to magic). A variant rule, known as "psionics are different," enforces a separation between the two systems; this rule also provides an intermediate step where each system has a diminished effect upon the other (for example, making a dispel check against an opposing energy would take a −4 penalty, and creatures with spell resistance gain power resistance equal to their spell resistance minus 10).

In 4th edition, the psionic power source is one of several supernatural power sources. A character's powers generally do not interact with other characters' powers based on power source:  for example, the 4th edition version of Dispel Magic can dispel any effect with the Conjuration or Zone keyword, regardless of power source.

History

Original Dungeons & Dragons
Psionics were first introduced in the supplement Eldritch Wizardry (1976).

Advanced Dungeons & Dragons First Edition
Optional rules for psionics were included in the original Player's Handbook. Psionic abilities were included in the Advanced Dungeons & Dragons First Edition Player's Handbook, which presented them as an optional ability available to many monsters and to players who could qualify with lucky rolls. There was no official specific character class that specialized in psionic powers, although an unofficial class, the psionicist, was introduced in Dragon Magazine issue #78.  Much of the rules mechanics for psionic combat were found separately in the Dungeon Masters Guide.

Second Edition
Psionics rules were initially absent in AD&D Second Edition, but were reintroduced with the 128-page expansion The Complete Psionics Handbook. Game designer Rick Swan referred to this book as "a straightforward presentation of an easily managed and highly playable system that clears up the ambiguities in the 1st Edition game and adds a number of elegant new touches".

In The Complete Psionics Handbook, the skills of the psionicist are based on wisdom and constitution just as a fighter's abilities derive from strength and a wizard's talents stem from intelligence. Characters of chaotic alignment were not allowed to become psionicists, with the rationale being that volatile chaotics lack the discipline required to focus their mental energies. The book assigned psionic powers to six disciplines, which include clairsentience (divination), psychokinesis (animating and controlling existing objects and forces), psychometabolism (body-changing powers), psychoportation (teleportation variants), telepathy (mental communication and psychic attacks), and metapsionics (enhancement of other psychic abilities). Powers are designated as either sciences (major powers) or devotions (minor powers). As a psionicist gains experience and advances in level, he acquires more powers; for instance, a 1st-level psionicist has only one science and three devotions, but gets 10 sciences and 25 devotions if he makes it to 20th level. As a psionicist rises through the ranks, he also gains access to defense modes, which are special telepathic powers, such as Mind Blank and Tower of Iron Will, which are received free of charge and don't count against a psionicist's normal power limits. Each power has a score rated in terms of a particular attribute. When attempting to use a power, the player makes a Power Check by rolling 1d20 and comparing the result to the Power Score. A roll less than or equal to the Power Score means success. Additionally, each power description includes a specific penalty suffered by the psionicist if a 20 is rolled. A psionicist has a fixed number of Psionic Strength Points, derived from his wisdom score, to expend on psionic powers. A psionicist simply expends the number of PSPs required by a particular power, then attempts a Power Check. If the check fails and the power doesn't work, he forfeits half the PSP cost but is free to try again later. If he passes the check and the power is successful, the psionicist has the option of expending additional PSPs to maintain the power in subsequent rounds. Psionicists recover lost PSPs every hour in which no additional PSPs are expended. The less physical exertion, the more PSPs recovered; a walking PC recovers 3 PSPs per hour, and a resting PC recovers twice as many. The book presents over 150 powers, such as Enhanced Strength, Inflict Pain, Switch Personality, Hear Light, Psychic Surgery, Flesh Armor, Cause Decay, Levitation, ESP, Teleport, and Clairaudience. Psychic combat has its own chapter, and the book includes updates on psionic monsters (including the thought eater and cerebral parasite), a discussion of society's reaction to psionicists, and a section describing the role of psionics in Ravenloft and other TSR campaign settings.

Dragon Magazine issue #174 included "Are You Having Bad Thoughts?" an article by Ravenloft designer Bruce Nesmith that details how psionics work in the Demiplane of Dread. The power selection for the psionicist class was later expanded by the card-based Deck of Psionic Might supplement. The Dark Sun campaign setting used psionics as a core part of its setting's rules; in the world of Athas (home to the Dark Sun setting), every character and most monsters possessed some psionic wild talent, and all Dark Sun campaign PCs have at least one psionic talent, as described in The Complete Psionics Handbook. Several Dark Sun products introduced new psionic powers.

Revision
The psionics system was greatly revised in Player's Option: Skills & Powers and the revised Dark Sun Campaign Setting. Psionic abilities are determined by a character's Wisdom, Constitution, and Intelligence scores. Any character with sufficiently high scores and some luck will have some psionic talent known as a "wild talent"; any player character in the Dark Sun world will have psionic talent. Characters have Psionic Strength Points (PSPs) and a Mental Armor Class (MAC); attacking involves expending PSPs, and making an attack roll against the target's MAC. The system was redevised around a Mental Armor Class (MAC) and a Mental THAC0 (MTHAC0), mimicking the Armor Class (AC) and THAC0 used in normal combat. The harder the power was to use, the lower the MAC was to activate it. Likewise, the harder a mind was to break into, the lower that person's MAC was. Psionicists would have MTHAC0 scores that represent their ability to wield the psionic arts. This was exactly 21 minus the level of the psionicist. Many of the powers were also altered in this revision.

A reviewer for the British magazine Arcane felt that this system was "a much more logical set-up than was previously in use. It's a matter of taste, though, as to whether you think there's any need for spell-like psionic powers when the game already supports such a wide variety of magical styles."

3rd and 3.5 editions
Psionics were overhauled once again in the release of the Psionics Handbook (2001) for Dungeons & Dragons Third Edition. The psionicist was renamed to the "psion" and more closely resembled the magic-using sorcerer in terms of combat ability, and a new character class, the psychic warrior, was introduced. Psions were given several new abilities and psionic powers that were intended to complement the new and revised abilities of the magic-using character classes, and psionic items were introduced to give psionic characters an alternative to using magical items.

The psionics system was again revised for the 3.5 edition of the game, in the Expanded Psionics Handbook (2004). This change streamlined the system by eliminating most power "chains", replacing them with the ability to augment powers by spending additional power points, as well as eliminating the psionic combat system that had previously been employed. A key change was changing powers that had previously been keyed to a different ability score for each disciple to a single ability score depending on character class. The book also introduced other races, such as the "Elan", psionic characters who had achieved immortality. The May 2004 issue of Dragon introduced the "Athasian elan" as a playable character race for the Dark Sun campaign setting.

The book Complete Psionic (2006) introduced three new standard classes as well as several prestige classes for the psionic character. It also includes a variant psion class called the "erudite" which does not specialize in a specific discipline in the way that psions do (putting it on par with wizard and archivist). It also has the ability to learn an unlimited number of powers but can manifest only a limited few each day. Complete Psionic also introduced a number of minor rules changes and clarifications.

4th Edition
The Player's Handbook 3, published March 16, 2010, includes four psionic classes, the ardent, battlemind, monk and psion. Psionic powers are called disciplines. Monks use the same general system of at-will, encounter and daily attack and utility powers, while the other three classes lack encounter attack powers, instead possessing a pool of power points which they can use to augment their at-will attack powers.

5th Edition
On July 6, 2015, Wizards of the Coast published an Unearthed Arcana article on their website introducing a playtest version of new psionics rules for 5th Edition D&D. The article also describes a new psionic class, the Mystic, which could resemble one of several different psionic classes from past editions, depending on the player's choice of Psionic Order. An online survey was conducted to gather feedback from the community, and on September 11, Wizards reported that the core rules were "a good start," but the Mystic class could use greater flexibility. However, an Unearthed Arcana article published on April 14, 2020, explained that, in spite of some positive response from the fans, the Mystic class was being removed in favor of options for existing classes to use psionic powers. 

The three psionic subclasses were  outlined in the 2019 article in Unearthed Arcana offered a look at psionic subclasses for the Fighter, Rogue, and Wizard. Two Third Edition classes, the Psychic Warrior for Fighters, the Soulknife for Rogues were brought back as subclasses, and a new psionic Arcane Tradition was created for Wizards. This playtest also included several new psionic flavored spells and feats. Designers continued to revise the psionic rules releasing another playtest in an Unearthed Arcana article published in March 2020. The revisions kept the Soulknife as a Rogue subclass, changed the name of the Psychic Warrior to the Psi Knight, and dropped the Psionics Wizard subclass in favor of a new, Sorcerer subclass called the Psychic Soul. It also included new spells, feats, and features for each. A new Psionic Talent Die was included which would gradually grow in size as a player levels up, and offer either increases in damage, or other mechanical augmentations to a psion's powers.
 At their online gaming event D&D Celebration Wizards' of the Coast revealed that the upcoming supplement Tasha's Cauldron of Everything would include a new take on Psionics.

Psionic classes
In 1st edition, there was no specific character class for psionics. In 2nd edition, only one psionic character class was introduced, the Psionicist. In 3rd edition this class was renamed "Psion", and various new alternate classes were introduced based on psionics usage. Psionics Handbook was later updated for version 3.5 with the Expanded Psionics Handbook, and new material was added in the Complete Psionic book.

In the fourth edition, psionic power is considered to be a power source on a par with martial, divine, arcane, or primal power. The Psion was reintroduced as a psionic controller, along with the Ardent, Battlemind, and Monk.

Monk

In 4th edition, the Monk uses the psionic power source.

Psion / Psionicist

Psionicists and Psions are dedicated to the usage of psionic power.

A Psionicist is much like a Wizard, except that his powers derive from his mind rather than external agencies. As Psionicists gain experience, they gain access to more attack and defense strategies and to more psionic powers.

2nd edition
The Psionicist class was introduced in 2nd edition, in which it is the sole official psionic class, in The Complete Psionics Handbook. Psionicists use psionics according to 2nd edition's standard psionics system, in which they expend Psionic Strength Points to activate and sustain powers, and activating most powers requires a roll based on an ability score.

3rd and 3.5 editions
In 3rd and 3.5 editions, Psions are mechanically similar to Sorcerers; however, like Wizards, they can (and, unlike Wizards, must) specialize in one of the psionic disciplines. In 3rd edition the various disciplines were each linked to a statistic; for instance, clairsentience is linked to Wisdom, and Psions who specialize in it are known as Seers. This was changed in 3.5 so that all disciplines are linked to the Intelligence statistic. Psion is the favored class of the elan race (found in the Expanded Psionics Handbook). In both 3rd and 3.5 editions, Psions expend power points to activate their psionic powers. In 3.5 edition, psionic powers can be augmented by spending additional power points on them.

4th edition
In 4th Edition Dungeons & Dragons, Psions are a Psionic Controller class. Unlike most 4th edition classes, Psions do not have any encounter attack powers, instead, they have a pool of power points, which can be used to augment at-will attack powers. Like encounter powers, power points are recharged by a short rest. A preview was presented in Dragon Magazine #375 in May 2009, and the class is among the classes included in the Player's Handbook 3, which was released on March 16, 2010.

Psionicists and Psions in other media
Psionicists are among the classes in Dark Sun: Shattered Lands and Dark Sun Online: Crimson Sands PC games. Psions are among the classes in the 2007 PSP game Dungeons & Dragons Tactics.

Psychic Warrior

Introduced in 3rd edition, psychic warriors are a blend between Fighters and Psions. Like fighters, they gain bonus feats, and like Psions, they wield psionic powers, though at a slower rate than either specialized class. Their attack bonus and hit point growth is similarly in the middle. Psychic warrior is the favored class of half-giants (found in the Expanded Psionics Handbook).

Soulknife

Soulknives are warriors who have learned to channel psionic power into "mind blades", or swords composed of psionic energy. Their broad training allows them to take many occupations and be a "jack of all trades." Soulknives are the only psionic characters who cannot manifest powers from their class; the soulknife class grants power points, but not the ability to use them. As a soulknife gains levels, the powers of her mind blade increase, such as the ability to form her mind blade into shapes other than a short sword (a concept further expanded with new feats in Complete Psionic). Soulknife is the favored class of the xeph race (found in the Expanded Psionics Handbook. Soulknife was a prestige class in the original Psionics Handbook, but it was made into a base class when psionics were revised for v3.5.

Wilder

Introduced in 3.5 edition, wilders can use "wild surges", which allow them to augment their psionic powers to a greater extent than normal. Doing so is dangerous: every time a wild surge is used there is a chance that the wilder will suffer from "psychic enervation" causing them to become dazed and lose power points. They are slightly tougher than Psions, but gain fewer abilities and slower. Wilder is the favored class of the dromite and maenad races (both found in the Expanded Psionics Handbook).

Other psionic classes
The following classes were introduced in 3.5 editions' Complete Psionic.

Psionic items
In 2nd edition, all psionic items are intelligent items with PSP pools and the ability to use psionic powers.

In 3rd edition, psionic items are much closer to magic items. They are generally not intelligent items, and are divided into nine categories: armor, shields, melee weapons, ranged weapons, psionic tattoos, cognizance crystals, power stones, dorjes and universal items. Armor, shields and weapons have enhancement bonuses and abilities like their magical counterparts, cognizance crystals store power points with no other power, dorjes are the psionic equivalent of wands, power stones are the psionic equivalent of scrolls, psionic tattoos are the psionic counterpart of potions, and universal items are the psionic counterpart of wondrous items.

References

External links
The Hypertext d20 SRD – Psionic Races, Classes, Skills, & Spells Index

Dungeons & Dragons character classes